Lieutenant Clinton Leonard Jones, Jr. was an American World War I flying ace credited with eight aerial victories.

Clinton Jones was a late arrival to World War I, arriving at the 22nd Aero Squadron on 27 August 1918. However, from 4 September through 30 October, Jones scored eight victories; five solo, and three shared with Jacques Swaab, James Beane, Arthur Raymond Brooks, and F. D. Tyndall.

Childhood
Clinton Leonard Jones was born on Jan 1, 1892 in Ross, California to Clinton Jones Sr. and Sarah J. Waugh.  His father was a general agent for a railroad.  He grew up in San Francisco.  He had six older siblings, Edward, Paul, Frank, Herbert, Gertrude and Helen.

Citations
Distinguished Service Cross

 The Distinguished Service Cross is presented to Clinton Jones, Second Lieutenant (Air Service), U.S. Army, for extraordinary heroism in action near Landres-et-St. Georges, France, October 30, 1918. Lieutenant Jones, while attacking four enemy planes (Fokker type), was in turn attacked from above and obliged to dive through a formation of 15 planes (Fokker type). His plane was riddled with bullets, but he managed to destroy one of the enemy machines.

Oak Leaf Cluster in lieu of a second DSC
 The Distinguished Service Cross is presented to Clinton Jones, Second Lieutenant (Air Service), U.S. Army, for extraordinary heroism in action near St. Mihiel, France, October 18, 1918. Second Lieutenant Jones was a member of a patrol which succeeded in hedging in a fast enemy bi-place plane. Approaching the enemy plane, Lieutenant Jones signaled the enemy to give up and land. The reply was a burst of machinegun fire, which cut his wind shield and set fire to his plane. He then closed in and shot the German pilot and sent the plane crashing to the ground. He landed in his own plane and extinguished the flames.

Later life
He is listed in the 1930 census as living in Sacramento and working as a Manager in the grain industry.  He married Edith and had two children, Gertrude and Clinton III.  He died in Sacramento on June 22, 1965.

See also

 List of World War I flying aces from the United States

References

Bibliography
 American Aces of World War I. Norman Franks, Harry Dempsey. Osprey Publishing, 2001. , .

American World War I flying aces
Aviators from California
Recipients of the Distinguished Service Cross (United States)
1892 births
1965 deaths
People from Ross, California